Songjiang is a suburban district (formerly a county) of Shanghai. Owing to a long history, Songjiang is known as the cultural root of Shanghai.

Songjiang Town, the urban center of the district, was formerly the major city in the area. It is now connected to downtown Shanghai by Line 9 of the Shanghai Metro.

History
The prehistoric coastline of the East China Sea was much farther inland, at Xinzhuang near Songjiang's current eastern border with Minhang District. It was only gradually that silt from the Yangtze River filled in downtown Shanghai about 2000 years ago and then Pudong and Chongming Island over the last 1000 years.

Modern archaeology has established a chronology of the main cultural groups who lived in the present area of Songjiang District in Neolithic China: the Majiabang in the 5th millennium ), the Songze in the 4th millennium), and the Liangzhu in the 3rd millennium. The Majiabang were among the first harvesters of rice and kept domesticated pigs while still frequently hunting deer. The Liangzhu possessed a high stratified society that almost certainly represented one of the earliest states in East Asia. The Liangzhu site at Guangfulin in Songjiang has been developed into Guangfulin Relics Park, an expansive museum and tourist attraction.

Traditional Chinese historiography only recorded these people as among the Baiyuethe "Numerous Southern Barbarians"until the growth of the siniticized Wu Kingdom at Suzhou in the 1st millennium. During the Spring and Autumn Period at the end of the Zhou and under the Warring States, the area of present-day Songjiang passed from Wu to Yue to Chu before the unification of China under Shi Huangdi of Qin in the 3rd century.

In the Three Kingdoms Period that followed the end of the Han in the 3rd century, Sun Quan's Wu Kingdom helped develop and further sinify the area. Another boost came from the completion of the Grand Canal under the Sui, linking Songjiang with Hangzhou, Shaoxing, and Ningbo in the south and Suzhou, Luoyang, Xi'an, and Beijing in the north. By the mid-Tang, the region had developed enough that it was organized in 751 into Huating County, the first county-level administration within modern-day Shanghai.

In the 1250s at the end of the Southern Song, the 10-year-old Songjiangese girl Huang Daopo fled her hometown and an arranged marriage to live with the Hlai on Hainan. She returned around 1295 with new strains of cotton, an early cotton gin, and other advances to cotton cultivation and processing that made the sandy lands of eastern Huating County so much more prosperous that Huang was later deified out of gratitude. By the mid-Qing, as much as ¾ of Songjiang's farmland was devoted to cotton. Under the Yuan, this new wealth saw Huating elevated to prefectural status and renamed Songjiangfu. This is sometimes considered the origin of China's modern textile industry. It was also under the Yuan that the city first had enough Hui to establish Shanghai's first mosque.

In 1404, headwaters previously emptying into the Wusong were rerouted by local officials, diminishing the size of Suzhou Creek and expanding the Huangpu River to its modern importance. Songjiang was better fortified under the Ming in response to attacks by the Japanese "Wokou" pirates, who sometimes raided and sometimes occupied to the town. The Ming also saw the Jesuitswho counted the influential Shanghainese official Xu Guangqi among their convertsestablish the town's first known church. Owing to the importance of Portuguese and Latin at the time, the town's name was romanized Sumkiam.

Following Dorgon's 21 July 1645 edict mandating the queue, the people of Songjiang rose up against the Qing to protect their hair, viewed as a symbol of virility and filial piety. Li Chengdong (d. 1649) retook the city and massacred its population on 22 September 1645. Nonetheless, Songjiang remained the primary metropolis of the area of present-day Shanghai as late as the mid-19th century, when its name was typically romanized as Sungkiang. It continued to serve as the prefectural capital under the "Right" Governor of Jiangnan based in Suzhou and then later under the governor of Jiangsu at Jiangning (now Nanjing). Unlike the foreign-held area of Shanghai, however, it fell to rebels during the Taiping Rebellion's Eastern Expedition. About a hundred Europeans under Frederick Townsend Ward failed to retake the town in June 1860. After gathering more Westerners, over 80 Philippine "Manilamen", and several pieces of artillery, a second assault in July 1860 retook the town with heavy losses. Out of about 250 men, 62 were killed and about 100 wounded, including Ward. Songjiang was then used by Ward, Henry Andres Burgevine, their Ever-Victorious Army, and Cheng Xueqi's division of the Huai Army as a base for raids and attacks on other Taiping positions under Li Xiucheng throughout the "Battle of Shanghai". 

Despite Shanghai's greater importance by the beginning of the 20th century, its international settlement meant Songjiang was still used as the formal center of Chinese government for the region. Under the Republic of China, the Zhili clique leader Sun Chuanfang's Songhu or Songjiang Special Administrative District covered most of what is now Shanghai Municipality, extending as far north as Chongming Island.

During World War II, Japan occupied Songjiang from 9 November 1937 until 1945. Afterwards, both the Nationalist and Communist regional government was moved to Shanghai proper, leaving Songjiang a comparatively rural county. The city's many ancient religious structures and examples of traditional architecture were seriously damaged during the 1960s and 1970s amid the Cultural Revolution. Following the PRC's Opening Up Policy, Songjiang restored its more important religious buildings and developed into a college town hosting several large universities. In 1998, it was elevated to its current status as an urban district.

Cultural Significant Features
As the cultural root of Shanghai, Songjiang preserves brilliant and unique prehistoric, ancient and modern cultural significant features.

In the prehistoric period, there formed Majiabang Culture, Songze Culture, Liangzhu Culture and Guangfulin Culture in Songjiang. The recent unearthed farming and working tools as well as rice and animal remains proved that people living in Songjiang at that time had already known how to plough the farming land, which pushed the primitive agricultural society forward to a more civilized one.

At the beginning of the 21st century, discoveries in Songjiang Guangfulin Cultural Relics made great contribution to archaeology. Firstly, it clearly divided the primitive society into types like Songze Cultural, Liangzhu Cultural and Guangfulin Cultural, which was considered to be the cultural relics of New Stone Era in Taihu area; secondly, immigrants from the Yellow River were conformed to be the first group of immigrants coming Shanghai; thirdly, there were towns in Shanghai dating back to as far as Zhou Dynasty; fourthly, two unique types of houses in primitive society were found: stilt house and ground house.

As time passed by, there were two important periods in the ancient Chinese society: the Western Jin Dynasty and the Ming Dynasty, characterized by the following four significant cultural features:

1.Originality

Excellent cultural environment in Songjiang cultivated a great number of elites, represented by litterateurs like Lu Ji and Lu Yun in the Western Jin Dynasty, Chinese painters like Dong Qichang in the Ming Dynasty and writers like Tao Zongyi in the Yuan Dynasty. They all created revolutionary and practical theories into their fields, making great contribution to the further development of Chinese art and literature, and were known to us for their originality and creativity.

2. Inclusivity

There were many kinds of art and literature schools in Songjiang, and three historical immigrants from the northern part of China, respectively taking place at the end of Jin Dynasty, mid-Tang Dynasty and Song Dynasty, brought along northern culture and stimulated the cultural kindness and inclusivity of Songjiang. In addition, when the five biggest religions in China are growing bigger and bigger and get along with each other in Songjiang, they learned from not only other religions but also unique culture in Songjiang and formed their special characteristics, which shows the cultural inclusivity in Songjiang culture.

3. Guidingness

A famous art and literature school---Yunjian rooted and gained its fame here. Yunjian school represents both ancient literature and modern ones, combining practical ideas with ideal ones, which has a profound influence on the development of ancient Chinese poetry, painting and calligraphy. Its representatives are Chen Zilong, Chen Wen, Mo Shilong, Dong Qichang and Lu Ji.

4.radiativity

From the beginning of ancient Chinese imperial examinations at the end of the Sui Dynasty, Songjiang had cultivated all together 521 Jinshi, successful candidates in the highest imperial examinations, which was a rare scene in the Chinese examination history. These successful candidates, being high government officials, all made great contributions to the country. Songjiang also has great influence on the development of newspaper, cotton manufacturing and agriculture.

Significant Features
Some of the notable features in Songjiang District include:
 Songjiang New City is a major new-town development located within Songjiang District. It was developed as part of Shanghai's "One City, Nine Towns" plan. The New City will encompass an area of  when completed, and will have a total population of 500,000 residents. The New City reflects Garden City design principles, with a large proportion of land allocated to green-space and parks.
 Thames Town is a residential and commercial development located within the Songjiang New City that both imitates and is influenced by classic English market town styles. Some of the architecture has been directly copied from buildings found in England.
 Songjiang University Town is a major higher education sector located in the district. It is the largest higher education sector in mainland China.
 Shanghai First People's Hospital has a campus located within the Songjiang New City.
 Shanghai Film Studios are located in Songjiang District.
 InterContinental Hotel Shanghai Wonderland is built against the walls of a former quarry, and partly underwater: it claims to be the world's first underground five-star resort.

Cultural sights in Songjiang include:
 Sheshan Hill with Sheshan Basilica
 Fangta Park, one of the first celebrations of traditional Chinese architecture following the Cultural Revolution, including the city's Square Pagoda and Mazu Temple
 Huzhu Pagoda on Tianmashan

Government and infrastructure
The Shanghai Women's Prison is in Songjiang District.

Transport
Songjiang is currently served by one metro line operated by Shanghai Metro, one suburban line operated by China Railway, and two tram lines.

Metro
 - Songjiang South Railway Station, Zuibaichi, Songjiang Sports Center, Songjiang Xincheng, Songjiang University Town, Dongjing, Sheshan, Sijing, Jiuting

Suburban Rail
 - Chunshen, Xinqiao, Chedun, Yexie

Songjiang Tram
Line T1
Line T2

Subdistricts and towns
Songjiang District has six subdistricts, eleven towns and three special township-level divisions.

Climate

Attractions
Xilin Chan Temple is a Buddhist temple in Yueyang Subdistrict, which is also a famous tourist attraction.

Zuibaichi is one of the five ancient Chinese gardens in Shanghai that dates back to the Song Dynasty.

The Songjiang Mosque is the oldest mosque in Shanghai with its latest rebuild in 1391.

Songjiang's emblematic tower is the 9-story Fangta Pagoda, or Songjiang Square Pagoda.

Dacang Bridge is a historic stone arch bridge over the Old City River in the district.

Notable people
Birthplace:
 Han Bangqing - Author of The Sing-song Girls of Shanghai (Lou County, Songjiang Prefecture)
Heroes: Hou Shaoqiu, Jiang Huilin, Xia Yunyi, Chen Zilong, Xia Wanchun;

Statesmen: Gu Yong, Lu Xun, Xu Jie;

Litterateurs: Lu Ji, Lu Yun, Chen Jiru, Qian Fu, Gu Qing;

Chinese Painting and Calligraphy (Songjiang was listed among "cities of Calligraphy" in 2013) Artists: Shen Du, Dong Qichang, Zhang Nanheng, Zhang Zhao, Shi Zhecun, Cheng Shifa;

Craftsmen: Zhu Kerou, Huang Daopo, Ding Niangzi;

Experts: Tao Zongyi, Zhu Shunshui, Chen Yongkang;

Educators: He Dong, Ping Hailan, Ma Xiangru.

Intelligent woman: Ye Gu

References

Further reading

External links

Songjiang Official Local Government Website
Downtown Songjiang - English travel guide of Songjiang

 
Districts of Shanghai